Christabel Gertrude Marshall (aka Christopher Marie St John) (24 October 1871  – 20 October 1960) was a British campaigner for women's suffrage, a playwright and author. Marshall lived in a ménage à trois with the artist Clare Atwood and the actress, theatre director, producer and costume designer Edith Craig from 1916 until Craig's death in 1947.

Biography
Born in Exeter, she was the youngest of nine children of Emma Marshall, née Martin (1828–1899), novelist, and Hugh Graham Marshall (c.1825–1899), manager of the West of England Bank. She changed her name on her conversion to Catholicism in adulthood. Having taken a BA in Modern History at Somerville College, Oxford, Marshall became the secretary to Mrs Humphry Ward, Lady Randolph Churchill and, occasionally, to her son Winston Churchill.

In order to pursue her aim of becoming a dramatist, Marshall went on the stage for three years to learn stagecraft, and occasionally acted as secretary to Ellen Terry. She lived with Terry's daughter Edith Craig from 1899 to Craig's death in 1947.  They lived together at Smith Square and then 31 Bedford Street, Covent Garden as well as Priest's House, Tenterden, Kent. Their relationship became temporarily strained when Craig received, and accepted, a marriage proposal from the composer Martin Shaw in 1903, and Marshall attempted suicide.  In 1916 Marshall and Craig were joined by the artist Clare 'Tony' Atwood, living in a ménage à trois until Craig died in 1947, according to Michael Holroyd in his book A Strange Eventful History. In 1900 Marshall published her first novel, The Crimson Weed, which takes its title from a transformation of the traditional symbol of the red rose. A feminist, in 1909 she joined the Women's Social and Political Union (WSPU), having previously worked for the Women Writers' Suffrage League and the Actresses' Franchise League.

In 1909 Marshall turned Cicely Hamilton's short story How The Vote Was Won into a play that became popular with women's suffrage groups throughout the United Kingdom. Also in 1909, Marshall joined a WSPU deputation to the House of Commons of the United Kingdom, contributing an article Why I Went on the Deputation to the journal Votes for Women in July 1909. In November 1909 Marshall appeared as the woman-soldier Hannah Snell in Cicely Hamilton's Pageant of Great Women, directed by Edith Craig. With Hamilton she also wrote The Pot and the Kettle (1909), and with Charles Thursby, The Coronation (1912). In May 1911 her play The First Actress was one of the three plays in the first production of Craig's theatre society, the Pioneer Players.  Marshall's plays Macrena and On the East Side were produced by the Pioneer Players, as well as her translation (with Marie Potapenko) of The Theatre of the Soul by Nikolai Evreinov.

Marshall converted to Catholicism in 1912 and took the name St John.  She, Edith Craig and Clare Atwood were friends with many artists and writers including lesbian novelist Radclyffe Hall, who lived nearby in Rye.  As Christopher St John in 1915, she published her autobiographical novel Hungerheart, which she had started in 1899, and which she based on her relationship with Edith Craig and her own involvement in the women's suffrage movement.  St John was contracted by Ellen Terry to assist on various publications.   After Terry's death in 1928, St John published the Shaw–Terry Correspondence (1931) and Terry's Four Lectures on Shakespeare (1932). St John and Craig revised and edited Terry's Memoirs (1933).  After Edith Craig's death in 1947, St John and Atwood helped to keep the Ellen Terry Memorial Museum in operation.  Some of St John's papers have survived in the National Trust's Ellen Terry and Edith Craig Archive.

Marshall died from pneumonia connected with heart disease at Tenterden in 1960. Marshall and Atwood are buried alongside each other at St John the Baptist's Church, Small Hythe. Craig's ashes were supposed to be buried there as well, but at the time of Marshall and Atwood's deaths, the ashes got lost and a memorial was placed in the cemetery instead.

References

External links
The Orlando Project of Women Writers 

1871 births
1960 deaths
English stage actresses
English LGBT people
English suffragists
English dramatists and playwrights
Alumni of Somerville College, Oxford
English LGBT dramatists and playwrights